Jordy Deckers (born 20 June 1989) is a Dutch professional footballer who plays as a goalkeeper for Veensche Boys.

Club career
He formerly played for AZ, Telstar, Ajax, Excelsior and VVV-Venlo.

He joined FC Oss in September 2016, after a summer 2016 move to Cypriot side Ermis Aradippou did not work out and he was released after only three months.

References

External links
 

1989 births
Living people
Footballers from Almere
Association football goalkeepers
Dutch footballers
AZ Alkmaar players
SC Telstar players
AFC Ajax players
Excelsior Rotterdam players
VVV-Venlo players
Ermis Aradippou FC players
TOP Oss players
RKC Waalwijk players
SV Spakenburg players
Eredivisie players
Eerste Divisie players
Tweede Divisie players
Cypriot First Division players
Dutch expatriate footballers
Expatriate footballers in Cyprus
Dutch expatriate sportspeople in Cyprus
JOS Watergraafsmeer players